The Iziko Museums of Cape Town (from isiXhosa Iziko is“a hearth” – the traditional centre of the home where families would get together to share oral histories) — an amalgamation of 12 national museums located near the Cape Town city centre. Iziko museums spheres – natural history, social history and arts.

Natural History Collection
 South African Museum
 Iziko Planetarium

Social history collections
 Rust en Vreugd
 Koopmans-De Wet
 Castle of Good Hope
 Groot Constantia
 Bertram House
 Bo-Kaap Museum
  Slave Lodge 
  Maritime Centre
  Social History Centre

Art Collections
 South African National Gallery
  Michaelis Collection

Maritime 
 Maritime Centre
 SAS Somerset

External links

South Africa
Museums in Cape Town
Natural history museums in South Africa
Archaeological museums in South Africa